The canton of Le Châtelet-en-Brie is a French former administrative division, located in the arrondissement of Melun, in the Seine-et-Marne département (Île-de-France région). It was disbanded following the French canton reorganisation which came into effect in March 2015. It consisted of 13 communes, which joined the canton of Nangis in 2015.

Demographics

Composition 
The canton of Le Châtelet-en-Brie was composed of 13 communes:

Blandy
Chartrettes
Le Châtelet-en-Brie
Châtillon-la-Borde
Échouboulains
Les Écrennes
Féricy
Fontaine-le-Port
Machault
Moisenay
Pamfou
Sivry-Courtry
Valence-en-Brie

See also
Cantons of the Seine-et-Marne department
Communes of the Seine-et-Marne department

References

Chatelet en brie, Le
2015 disestablishments in France
States and territories disestablished in 2015